A furniture retailer, furniture store or furniture shop is a retail businesses that sells furniture and related accessories. Furniture retailers usually sell general furniture (like beds, tables, bookcases and wardrobes), seats and upholstered suites (like couches or sofas and chairs), and specialised items produced for a commission. They may sell a range of styles to suit different homes and personal tastes, or specialise in particular styles like retro style furniture.

Many stores also sell outdoor or garden furniture, such as dining tables, coffee tables, seats and couches, which are designed to be waterproof, rust-resistant and weather-proof rather than to follow modern indoor design trends.

Furniture retail sales directly correlate with the state of the economy and housing market. When interest rates are lower and housing sales are higher, like in the United States in the early 1990s, sales of household and garden furniture increases. When business conditions are positive, like in the United States in the late 1990s, sales of furniture for offices, hotels and restaurants increases.

History

The sector dates back the middle of the 19th century, when furniture sellers in North America and Europe began buying furniture from manufacturers at wholesale prices, and selling them to consumers in showrooms at higher prices. Many early showrooms had workshops to build specialty items.

By the early 20th century, most production of furniture was common in the United States, with major manufacturing centers in Jamestown, New York, High Point, North Carolina and Grand Rapids, Michigan. However, hand-crafted items remained in demand and furniture factories remained small.

World War II created a global shortage of wood products, preventing the production of furniture.

The sale of mass produced furniture in showrooms became more common in the second half of the twentieth century. The introduction of new materials, machinery, adhesives and finishes made it more difficult to distinguish commercially and handcrafted furniture. Many furniture retailers formed exclusive relationships with furniture manufacturers.

By market

North America

United States

 Aaron's, Inc.
 American Furniture Warehouse
 American Signature
 Arflex
 Arhaus
 Art Van Furniture
 Ashley HomeStore
 Badcock Home Furniture
 Barker Bros.
 Bassett Furniture
 Bob's Discount Furniture
 Bombay Company
 Brastilo
 Cabinets To Go
 ColorTyme
 Conlin's Furniture
 Crate & Barrel
 Curacao
 Darvin Furniture & Mattress
 Dearden's
 El Dorado Furniture
 Ethan Allen
 Florian Papp
 Fradkin Brothers Furniture
 Furnitureland South
 Gardner-White Furniture
 Ginn's Furniture Store
 Grand Home Furnishings
 Gump's
 Havertys
 Heilig-Meyers
 Heritage Home Group
 HomeGoods
 IKEA
 J.B. Van Sciver Co.
 JCPenney
 Jennifer Furniture
 JoAnne's Bed and Back
 Jordan's Furniture
 Kaas Tailored
 Kirkland's
 The Land of Nod
 Levin Furniture
 LoveSac
 McMahan's Furniture
 Mor Furniture
 Move Loot
 Nebraska Furniture Mart
 Norton Furniture
 One Workplace
 The Pace Collection
 Pier 1
 Plush Home
 Pottery Barn
 Raymour & Flanigan
 Relax The Back
 Rent-A-Center
 RH (company)
 Rhodes Furniture
 The Room Store
 Rooms To Go
 Scan Furniture
 Scandinavian Design
 Slumberland Furniture
 Star Furniture
 Storehouse Furniture
 Walter E. Smithe
 Wayfair
 RC Willey Home Furnishings
 Williams-Sonoma, Inc.
 Wolf Furniture
 World Market
 Yogibo
 Z Gallerie

Canada

 Artemano Canada
 Bouclair
 The Brick
 Cymax Group
 HomeSense
 Leon's
 LW Stores
 J. Pascal's Hardware and Furniture
 Structube
 United Furniture Warehouse
 Wholesale Furniture Brokers
 XS Cargo

Europe

 Bene AG
 Beter Bed
 Bohus (retailer)
 Conforama
 Höffner
 IDEmøbler
 IKEA
 ILVA
 Maisons du Monde

United Kingdom

 Arighi Bianchi
 Barker and Stonehouse
 Bensons for Beds
 Betta Living
 Boyes
 Christopher Pratts
 DFS Furniture
 Dreams
 Dwell (retailer)
 Feather & Black
 Furniture Village
 Great Little Trading Co
 Habitat (retailer)
 Harveys Furniture
 HomeForm Group
 House of Hackney
 Instyle Furniture
 Land of Leather
 Leekes
 Liberty
 Macy's
 Magnet Kitchens
 Maple & Co.
 MFI Group
 Multiyork
 Oak Furnitureland
 OKA Direct
 Perfecthome
 Peter Green
 Rosebys
 ScS
 Sharps Bedrooms
 Sofology
 Waring & Gillow

Serbia

 Forma Ideale
 SIMPO

Asia

 Courts Malaysia
 Courts Singapore
 Nitori
 Stellar Works

India

 Furlenco
 Godrej Interio
 Nilkamal Plastics
 Pepperfry
 Sarita Handa
 Urban Ladder

Oceania

 Coco Republic
 Fantastic Furniture
 Freedom Furniture
 Harvey Norman
 Milan Direct
 Nick Scali Furniture
 Target Australia
 Temple & Webster
 Winning Appliances

Middle East and Africa

 The One

References

Retailers by type of merchandise sold
 
Hardlines (retail)